Maria Osipovna (Iosifovna) Knebel (1 June 1985) was a Soviet and Russian actress, theatre practitioner and acting theorist. Having trained with Konstantin Stanislavski, Vladimir Nemirovich-Danchenko, and Michael Chekhov, her work integrated the approaches and emphases of all three, with a particular focus on Stanislavski's technique of "active analysis" in the rehearsal of plays. She worked as a character actor, a theatre director, and a teacher. Her students included the actor Oleg Yefremov, the playwright Viktor Rozov, and the directors Anatoly Vasiliev and Adolf Shapiro. In 1958, she was named a People's Artist of the RSFSR.

Her roles as an actor included Charlotta in Anton Chekhov's The Cherry Orchard, the madwoman in Alexander Ostrovsky's The Storm, and Sniffles in Maurice Maeterlinck's The Blue Bird at the Moscow Art Theatre.

In 1968, she directed a production of Chekhov's The Cherry Orchard at the Abbey Theatre in Dublin.

References

Sources

 Banham, Martin, ed. 1998. The Cambridge Guide to Theatre. Cambridge: Cambridge UP. .
 Carnicke, Sharon Marie. 2010. "The Knebel Technique: Active Analysis in Practice." Actor Training. Ed. Alison Hodge. 2nd ed. London: Routledge. 99—116. .
 Golub, Spencer. 1998. "Knebel, Mariya (Osipovna)." In Banham (1998, 603).
 Knebel, Maria. 2016. "Active Analysis of the Play and the Role." In Thomas (2016).
 Thomas, James. 2016. A Director's Guide to Stanislavsky's Active Analysis. London: Methuen. .

External links
 
 
 Maria Knebel at the Routledge Practitioners Pages

1898 births
1985 deaths
20th-century Russian actresses
Actresses from Moscow
People from Moskovsky Uyezd
Moscow Art Theatre
People's Artists of the RSFSR
Recipients of the Order of the Red Banner of Labour
Recipients of the USSR State Prize
Russian acting theorists
Russian drama teachers
Russian stage actresses
Russian theatre directors
Soviet acting theorists
Soviet drama teachers
Soviet stage actresses
Soviet theatre directors
Burials at Vvedenskoye Cemetery